The 1982 Bordeaux Open also known as the Grand Prix Passing Shot was a men's tennis tournament played on outdoor clay courts at Villa Primrose in Bordeaux, France that was part of the 1982 Volvo Grand Prix. It was the fourth edition of the tournament and was held from 23 September until 26 September 1982. The tournament changed all matches to best of three sets. Hans Gildemeister won the singles title.

Finals

Singles

 Hans Gildemeister defeated  Pablo Arraya 7–5, 6–1
 It was Gildemeister's 1st singles title of the year and the 4th and last of his career.

Doubles

 Hans Gildemeister /  Andrés Gómez defeated  Anders Järryd /  Hans Simonsson 6–4, 6–2

References

External links
 ITF tournament edition details

Bordeaux Open
ATP Bordeaux
Bordeaux Open
Bordeaux Open